Bystrik is a rural locality (a khutor) in Zemlyanskoye Rural Settlement, Semiluksky District, Voronezh Oblast, Russia. The population was 51 as of 2010.

Geography 
Bystrik is located 33 km northwest of Semiluki (the district's administrative centre) by road. Zemlyansk is the nearest rural locality.

References 

Rural localities in Semiluksky District